The Tomb of Abu Usman Al-Maghribi is built by the Pahlavi dynasty and This building is located in Nishapur.

Gallery

Sources 

Mausoleums in Iran